Rose Felicitas Pauly (born 8 June 1938) is a German politician. A member of the Free Democratic Party, she served as a member of the Hamburg Parliament from 1987 to 1993 and again from 2001 to 2004.

References

1938 births
Living people
Women members of State Parliaments in Germany
Members of the Hamburg Parliament
Free Democratic Party (Germany) politicians
20th-century German politicians
20th-century German women politicians
21st-century German politicians
21st-century German women politicians